Hugo David Storer Tavarez (March 8, 1908 – June 28, 1994) was a Puerto Rican industrialist, scholar and writer.

By 1954 he was the Director of Promotion of the Puerto Rico Economic Development Administration also known as "Fomento".  He was one of the men in charge of the Commonwealth Oil Refining Company being established in Puerto Rico. Afterwards starting on July 1, 1953 he was named Director of the Puerto Rico Tourism Bureau.

In 1970 he founded the Horticultural Society of P.R. to study native and imported exotic plants and organize activities on this behalf.  In 1977, to promote bonsai to all corners of the island, he organized a group which would later be called Club Bonsai de P.R.  He was known as the first person of bonsai in Puerto Rico.  In 1977 he was the editor of the book Catalogo filatelico de Puerto Rico by assignment of the "Sociedad Filatelica de Puerto Rico".

While a student at University of Puerto Rico, Rio Piedras Campus he and a group of other students founded what was to become Phi Sigma Alpha fraternity on October 22, 1928.  He was later the sixteenth president of Phi Sigma Alpha fraternity.

See also

List of Puerto Ricans
Phi Sigma Alpha

References

1908 births
1994 deaths
Bonsai artists
Phi Sigma Alpha founders
People from Utuado, Puerto Rico
University of Puerto Rico alumni
College_fraternity_founders